A Gaussian random field (GRF) within statistics, is a random field involving Gaussian probability density functions of the variables. A one-dimensional GRF is also called a Gaussian process.  An important special case of a GRF is the Gaussian free field.

With regard to applications of GRFs, the initial conditions of physical cosmology generated by quantum mechanical fluctuations during cosmic inflation are thought to be a GRF with a nearly scale invariant spectrum.

Construction
One way of constructing a GRF is by assuming that the field is the sum of a large number of plane, cylindrical or spherical waves with uniformly distributed random phase.  Where applicable, the central limit theorem dictates that at any point, the sum of these individual plane-wave contributions will exhibit a Gaussian distribution.  This type of GRF is completely described by its power spectral density, and hence, through the Wiener–Khinchin theorem, by its two-point autocorrelation function, which is related to the power spectral density through a Fourier transformation. 

Suppose f(x) is the value of a GRF at a point x in some D-dimensional space. If we make a vector of the values of f at N points, x1, ..., xN, in the D-dimensional space, then the vector (f(x1), ..., f(xN)) will always be distributed as  a multivariate Gaussian.

References

External links
For details on the generation of  Gaussian random fields using Matlab, see circulant embedding method for Gaussian random field.

Spatial processes